Batman: Chaos in Gotham is a video game that was released during 2000 by Ubisoft for the Nintendo Game Boy Color. It is based on The New Batman Adventures.

Plot

Arkham Asylum has undergone a massive breakout and all manner of super-villains are running rampant throughout Gotham City. While rounding up the escaped inmates, Mr. Freeze, The Joker, Harley Quinn, Roxy Rocket, Poison Ivy and Bane, Batman comes to find out that it was Two-Face who masterminded the breakout and must put a stop to him before he can bring Gotham City to its knees.

Reception

The game has received mixed reviews from both the critics and fans alike. GameRankings gave it a score of 63.50%.

References

External links
 

2001 video games
Game Boy Color games
Ubisoft games
Warner Bros. video games
Chaos in Gotham
Chaos in Gotham
Game Boy Color-only games
Superhero video games
Video games developed in the United States
Video games set in the United States
Digital Eclipse games
Single-player video games